Gary George Wetzel (born September 29, 1947) is a former United States Army soldier and a recipient of the United States military's highest decoration, the Medal of Honor, for his actions in the Vietnam War.

Military career

Wetzel joined the United States Army from Milwaukee, Wisconsin, at age 18 in 1965. By January 8, 1968, he was a private first class serving as a door gunner in the 173rd Assault Helicopter Company. On that day, near Ap Dong An, Republic of Vietnam, his helicopter was shot down and the survivors, including Wetzel, came under heavy enemy fire. Severely wounded by an explosion that nearly severed his left arm, he continued to man his machine gun and help other injured soldiers. Wetzel survived his wounds, although his left arm had to be amputated. He was subsequently promoted to specialist four and awarded the Medal of Honor for his actions.

Personal life
Wetzel lives in his hometown of South Milwaukee, Wisconsin, and works as a heavy equipment operator.

Medal of Honor citation
Wetzel's official Medal of Honor citation reads:

See also

List of Medal of Honor recipients for the Vietnam War

References

Bio

1947 births
Living people
American amputees
United States Army personnel of the Vietnam War
United States Army Medal of Honor recipients
United States Army soldiers
Military personnel from Milwaukee
Vietnam War recipients of the Medal of Honor
People from South Milwaukee, Wisconsin